Rectified spirit, also known as neutral spirits, rectified alcohol or ethyl alcohol of agricultural origin, is highly concentrated ethanol that has been purified by means of repeated distillation in a process called rectification. In some countries, denatured alcohol or denatured rectified spirit may commonly be available as "rectified spirit", because in some countries (though not necessarily the same) the retail of rectified alcohol in its non-denatured form is prohibited.

The purity of rectified spirit has a practical limit of 97.2% ABV (95.6% by mass) when produced using conventional distillation processes, as a mixture of ethanol and water becomes a minimum-boiling azeotrope at this concentration. However, rectified spirit is typically distilled in continuous multi-column stills at 96–96.5% ABV and diluted as necessary. Ethanol is a commonly used medical alcoholspiritus fortis is a medical term for ethanol with 95% ABV.

Neutral spirits can be produced from grains, corn, grapes, sugar beets, sugarcane, tubers, or other fermentable materials such as whey. In particular, large quantities of neutral alcohol are distilled from wine and/or by-products of wine production (pomace, lees). A product made from grain is "neutral grain spirit", while a spirit made from grapes is called "grape neutral spirit" or "vinous alcohol". These terms are commonly abbreviated as either GNS or NGS.

Neutral spirits are used in the production of several spirit drinks, such as blended whisky, cut brandy, most gins, some liqueurs and some bitters. As a consumer product, it is almost always mixed with other beverages to create drinks like alcoholic punch or Jello shots or is sometimes added to cocktails in place of vodka or rum. It is also used to make home made liqueurs, such as limoncello or Crème de cassis, and in cooking because its high concentration of alcohol acts as a solvent to extract flavors. Rectified spirits are also used for medicinal tinctures and as a household solvent. They are sometimes consumed undiluted; however, because the alcohol is so high-proof, overconsumption can cause alcohol poisoning more quickly than more traditional distilled spirits.

Regional

United States 
Neutral spirit is legally defined as spirit distilled from any material distilled at or above 95% ABV (190 US proof) and bottled at or above 40% ABV. When the term is used in an informal context rather than as a term of U.S. law, any distilled spirit of high alcohol purity (e.g., 170 proof or higher) that does not contain added flavoring may be referred to as neutral alcohol. Prominent brands of neutral spirits sold in the U.S. include:
 Brands made by Luxco:
 Everclear
 Crystal Clear
 Golden Grain
 Gem Clear
 Graves Grain Alcohol
"Grain spirit" is a legal classification for neutral spirit that is distilled from fermented grain mash and stored in oak containers.

Retail availability 
Availability of neutral spirit for retail purchase varies between states. States where consumer sales of high-ABV neutral spirit are prohibited include California, Florida, Hawaii, Maine, Maryland, Massachusetts, Michigan, Minnesota, New Hampshire, Nevada, North Carolina, Pennsylvania, Iowa, and West Virginia. In Virginia, the purchase of neutral spirits requires a no-cost "Grain Alcohol Permit", issued "strictly for industrial, commercial, culinary or medicinal use". In 2017, Virginia approved the sale of up to 151 proof neutral spirits at its ABC stores without a permit. Pennsylvania sells 151 proof without a permit but requires one for 190 proof.

European Union

Legal definition 
Under EU regulations, alcohol used in the production of some spirit drinks must be "ethyl alcohol of agricultural origin", which has to comply with the following requirements:

 Organoleptic properties: no detectable taste other than that of the raw materials used in its production;
 minimum alcoholic strength by volume: 96.0%;
 maximum levels of residues do not exceed (in grams per hectolitre of 100% vol. alcohol):
 acetic acid (total acidity): 1.5;
 ethyl acetate (esters): 1.3;
 acetaldehyde (aldehydes): 0.5;
 2-methyl-1-propanol (higher alcohols): 0.5;
 methanol: 30;
 nitrogen (volatile bases containing nitrogen): 0.1;
 dry extract: 1.5;
 furfural: not detectable.

Germany 
In Germany, rectified spirit is generically called Primasprit (colloquial) or, more technically, Neutralalkohol. It is available in pharmacies, bigger supermarkets, and East European markets. In the former East Germany, it was available in regular stores. Primasprit is most often used for making homemade liqueurs; other types of use are rare. Most of the Primasprit produced in Germany is made from grain and is, therefore, a neutral grain spirit.

Poland
Spirytus Rektyfikowany made by Polmos is the iconic brand with 96% ABV.

Norway 
The import and sale of spirits containing more than 60% alcohol by volume is prohibited, so only weaker grain spirits are permitted.

Latin America

Bolivia
Cocoroco

Moonshine

 A column still or spiral still can achieve a vapor alcohol content of 95% ABV.
 Moonshine is usually distilled to 40% ABV, and seldom above 66% based on 48 samples. For example, conventional pot stills commonly produce 40% ABV, and top out between 60 and 80% after multiple distillations. However, ethanol can be dried to 95% ABV by heating 3Å molecular sieves such as 3Å zeolite.

See also 

 Distilled beverage
 Vodka
 Edward Adam

References 

Distilled drinks
Vodkas